Segment routing, a form of computer networking, is a modern variant of source routing that is being developed within the SPRING and IPv6 working groups of the IETF. In a segment routed network, an ingress node may prepend a header to packets that contain a list of segments, which are instructions that are executed on subsequent nodes in the network. These instructions may be forwarding instructions, such as an instruction to forward a packet to a specific destination or interface.

Segment routing works either on top of a MPLS network or on an IPv6 network.
In an MPLS network, segments are encoded as MPLS labels. Under IPv6, a new header called a Segment Routing Header (SRH) is used. Segments in a SRH are encoded in a list of IPv6 addresses.

See also 
 Bang path
 Dynamic Source Routing
 Policy-based routing can also be used to route packets using their source addresses.
 Scalable Source Routing

References

External links
 The Segment Routing homepage
 The Linux implementation of IPv6 Segment Routing
 
 
 
 
 
 

Routing algorithms